Rattlesnake Canyon is the name of a number of scenic canyons in the Southwestern United States:

Rattlesnake Canyon (Arizona), a slot canyon near Antelope Canyon
Rattlesnake Canyon (Santa Barbara), lies within Skofield Park, in Santa Barbara, California
Rattlesnake Canyon (Colorado), lies within the Black Ridge Canyons Wilderness and is noted for its natural arches
Rattlesnake Canyon (New Mexico), lies within Carlsbad Caverns National Park
Rattlesnake Canyon Dam, a dam in Irvine, California
Rattlesnake Canyon Site, noted for its pictographs, NRHP in Val Verde County, Texas

Other places with Rattlesnake Canyon in their name:
 Rattlesnake Canyon (amusement park), an amusement park in Osoyoos, British Columbia